Keyshawn Davis (born February 28, 1999) is an American professional boxer. As an amateur, Davis won silver medals at the 2019 Pan American Games, 2019 World Championships, and 2020 Summer Olympics.

Amateur career

Olympic Games results
Tokyo 2020
 Round of 32: Defeated Enrico Lacruz (Netherlands) 5-0
 Round of 16: Defeated Sofiane Oumiha (France) RSC 
 Quarter-finals: Defeated Gabil Mamedov (Russian Olympic Committee) 4-1
 Semi-Finals: Defeated Hovhannes Bachkov (Armenia) 5-0
 Finals: Defeated by Andy Cruz (Cuba) 4-1

Pan American Games results
Lima 2019
Quarter-finals: Defeated Luis Arcon (Venezuela) W/O
Semi-finals: Defeated Michael Alexander (Trinidad and Tobago) 5–0
Final: Defeated by Andy Cruz (Cuba) 4–1

World Championship results
Yekaterinburg 2019
Round of 32: Defeated Elnur Abduraimov (Uzbekistan) 5–0
Round of 16: Defeated Michael Alexander (Trinidad and Tobago) 5–0
Quarter-finals: Defeated Sofiane Oumiha (France) 5–0
Semi-finals: Defeated Hovhannes Bachkov (Armenia) 4–1
Final: Defeated by Andy Cruz (Cuba) 5–0

Professional career

Early career
Davis made his professional debut against Lester Brown on February 27, 2021. In the second round, Davis dropped his opponent with a left hook to the head. Brown managed to recover from the knockdown and continue, however Davis secured victory after landing a combination of heavy punches which forced the referee to step in and end the bout.Davis' second bout as a professional was against Richman Ashelley on April 3, 2021. Davis was dominant throughout the bout and in the fourth round, landed a number of heavy punches which visibly hurt his opponent. This resulted in Ashelley retiring at the end of the round after his corner team judged that he was unable to continue.

Davis was taken the distance for the first time as a professional when he fought against Jose Antonio Meza on the undercard of Canelo Álvarez vs. Billy Joe Saunders on May 8, 2021. Davis won via wide unanimous decision after winning every round on each of the three scorecards.

Professional boxing record

References

1999 births
Living people
American male boxers
Sportspeople from Norfolk, Virginia
Lightweight boxers
AIBA World Boxing Championships medalists
Pan American Games medalists in boxing
Pan American Games silver medalists for the United States
Boxers at the 2019 Pan American Games
Medalists at the 2019 Pan American Games
Boxers from Virginia
Southpaw boxers
Boxers at the 2020 Summer Olympics
Medalists at the 2020 Summer Olympics
Olympic silver medalists for the United States in boxing

External links